The 27th Infantry Brigade Combat Team ("Empire") is an infantry brigade combat team of the New York Army National Guard, one of the brigades that make up the 42nd Infantry Division.

The state mission of the 27th Infantry Brigade is to maintain a manned, trained and equipped force capable of rapid deployment to any area within New York to aid civil authorities. The 27th Infantry Brigade Combat Team is also tasked with overseas deployment missions and must be capable to respond to any threat, foreign or domestic.

History
After World War I the 27th Infantry Division was reactivated back in the New York National Guard for peacetime service, climaxed by participation in the First Army maneuvers of 1940.

Composition of the Twenty-Seventh Division between the wars

 Fifty-third Infantry Brigade
 105th Infantry
 106th Infantry
 Fifty-fourth Infantry Brigade:
 107th Infantry
 108th Infantry
 Fifty-second Field Artillery Brigade:
 104th Field Artillery (75mm)
 105th Field Artillery (75mm)
 106th Field Artillery (155mm)
 102nd Ammunition Train
 Special Troops:
 Headquarters & Headquarters Company
 27 Military Police Company
 27th Signal Company
 27th Tank Company
 102nd Ordnance Company
 Separate Units:
 102nd Engineer Regiment
 27th Division Aviation (102nd Observation Squadron)
 102nd Medical Regiment
 102nd Quartermaster Regiment

World War II
The 27th Division was federalized for service on 15 October 1940 and sent to Fort McClellan, Alabama, for training, commanded by Major General William Haskell. At this time it still retained its World War I organization of two brigades and four regiments. The 53rd Infantry Brigade consisted of the 105th and 106th Infantry Regiments while the 54th Infantry Brigade contained the 108th and 165th Infantry Regiments. The initial call up was for one year which would have ended in October 1941; the President directed that all federalized National Guard units be extended for six months. The 27th Division was the first divisional unit deployed from the continental United States and left for California seven days after the Japanese attack on Pearl Harbor in the Territory of Hawaii. While in California the 27th awaited orders to ship out and concentrated on bringing itself up to the authorized field strength of 1,012 officers and 21,314 enlisted men. The division's strength had been reduced by discharges to around 14,000 men. The first elements of the division boarded ships bound for Hawaii on 27 February 1942. During its layover on the West Coast, the 27th was redesignated the 27th Infantry Division.

The division remained on Hawaii for a number of months, during which time it was triangularized, with the 108th Infantry Regiment being reassigned to the 40th Division. A division that was triangularized has been given three infantry regiments instead of the four of a square division. This final reorganization dismantled the brigade structure and again dropped the division's strength to 14,000 men. Following the reorganization, the 27th Division was shifted to Oahu, where it would relieve the 25th Infantry Division, which was slated to join the U.S. forces fighting in Guadalcanal. For most of its time in Hawaii, the 27th was under the command of Brigadier General Ralph Pennel.

On 20 November 1943, the 27th Infantry Division embarked on its first combat assignment, the capture of the coral atoll of Makin. The 27th also had a new division commander, Major General Ralph Smith. Units from the 27th Division also occupied the Majuro atoll on 1 February 1944 and successfully assaulted Eniwetok Island on 19 February of the same year. In June 1944, the division landed on Saipan, where its regiments fought together for the first time as a full division. Following Saipan the division was rested and reinforced at Espirto Santo for seven months before any further operations. During this time the 27th received its final division commander, Major General George Griner Jr. On 12 April 1945 the division landed on Okinawa, where it would remain until September when it was sent to Japan briefly for garrison duty. The division was mustered out in late December of the same year. Since its arrival in the Pacific, the 27th Infantry Division had suffered 1,512 killed in action, 4,980 wounded in action and 332 who later succumbed to their wounds.

General Smith had been removed from command following a dispute with the aggressive and eccentric Marine commander, General Holland "Howling Mad" Smith who had been in overall command of the Saipan invasion. Holland Smith claimed that Ralph Smith had disregarded orders and mishandled the 27th Division, prompting the relief order. Later court of inquiry showed that the charges were for the most part unsubstantiated and General Ralph Smith was quickly given a new command.

The 27th returned to the states for deactivation in December 1945, the longest serving National Guard unit.

Composition of the Twenty-Seventh Division in World War II

 Headquarters & Headquarters Co.
 Infantry: 105th, 106th and 165th Infantry Regiments
 Artillery: Headquarters Division Artillery, 104th, 105th, 106th, and 249th Field Artillery Battalions
 Admin Support: Military Police Platoon., 727th Ordnance Company, 27th Quartermaster Company, 102nd Medical Battalion
 Tactical Support: 102nd Engineer Battalion, 27th Reconnaissance Troop, 27th Signal Company

From soon after World War II to 1967–68 the 27th Infantry Division remained active in the National Guard.

Reduction to brigade, 1967-68
In 1967–68 the division was reduced to become a brigade of the 50th Armored Division.

Composition of the 27th Brigade, 50th Armored Division in 1968:
Headquarters & Headquarters Company
1st Battalion, 127th Armor
1st Battalion, 108th Infantry
1st Battalion, 174th Infantry
Troop B, 5th Squadron, 117th Cavalry
1st Battalion, 156th Artillery (later 156th Field Artillery)
Company C, 104th Engineer Battalion
Company C, 50th Medical Battalion
Company C, 50th Maintenance Battalion
Detachment 1, Company B, 250th Supply & Transportation Battalion
127th Quartermaster Detachment

Conversion to light infantry
The 27th Brigade was reconstituted as a separate infantry brigade (light) in the 1980s and was originally established as a "round-out" brigade to the Army's 10th Mountain Division (Light Infantry) at Fort Drum.

In the 1990s, the Army National Guard nationwide was reorganized and the 27th was established as one of 15 separate "enhanced" brigades, subject to priority call up in the event of a federal mobilization.

In 1998, the 27th Brigade was committed to disaster recovery operations in the New York's North Country following a devastating ice storm which struck in January.  The 27th was called again for state emergency response in the wake of a destructive wind storm which struck Syracuse on Labor Day that year forcing an early close to the New York State Fair.

In the summer of 2001, the 27th Brigade deployed for an intense three-week training period at the U.S. Army's Joint Readiness Training Center at Fort Polk, LA. Nearly 4,000 soldiers from the New York Army National Guard participated, making it the largest single exercise for the New York National Guard since World War II. The terrorist attacks of 9-11, 2001 struck within weeks of when the brigade returned home. Many members of the Brigade lived or worked in New York City at the time and several unit members were actually at the World Trade Center during the attacks.  Scores of unit members mustered at the headquarters of B Co, 1st Bn, 105th Infantry located at the 69th Regiment Armory on Lexington Avenue and within a matter of hours, roughly two platoons from B Company, including several soldiers and officers from other 27th Brigade units, deployed further downtown in two public buses borrowed from the MTA.  Their mission was to assist the New York Police Department in their security and recovery efforts and was the first Army unit to respond to Ground Zero on 9-11.

Following extensive state and federal active duty for Homeland Defense in response to the terrorist attacks of 9-11, 2001, subordinate units of the 27th underwent individual call ups for Operation Iraqi Freedom in 2003. In 2006, following the return of most New York National guard units from federal active duty in Iraq, the New York Army National Guard was "re-set" and the 27th was reorganized as an infantry brigade combat team.
The brigade was formed when the 27th Infantry Division was deactivated in 1967. (However, a previous 27th Brigade was active from Jul 1918 – Feb 1919 as part of the 14th Division, comprising the 10th and 77th Regiments.)

On 1 October 2003 elements from the 27th were mobilized in support of Operation Iraqi Freedom. Comprising the 2d Battalion, 108th Infantry (with volunteers from the 1st Battalion, 108th Infantry and the 1st Battalion, 105th Infantry); Company C, 427th Support Battalion; 827th Engineers Company; and Fire Support Teams from the 1st Battalion, 156th Field Artillery, Task Force Hunter deployed into Iraq in Feb 2004 after pre-deployment training at Fort Drum, New York and Fort Polk, Louisiana.

On 1 August 2007, the unit was redesignated as the 27th Infantry Brigade Combat Team, as part of the Army's move to a "modular" force, and it lost its former status as a separate brigade. Retaining its historic shoulder patch from the 27th Infantry Division (United States), the 27th became, once again, a component of the 42nd Infantry Division. Until then it had been designated the 27th Infantry Brigade (Light) and had been one of the fifteen "enhanced brigades" found in the Army National Guard's force structure. From 1985 until 2005, the 27th had also been the "round-out" brigade of the Regular Army's 10th Mountain Division (Light Infantry), based in upstate New York at Fort Drum. It lost this mission when the 10th added its 3d and 4th Brigades, composed of active-duty Regular Army soldiers, during its own reorganization.

On 27 September 2007 advanced elements from the 27th, primarily composed of soldiers from the 2d Battalion, 108th Infantry and 1st Battalion, 69th Infantry, as well as volunteers from 2d Squadron, 101st Cavalry, began shipping out from New York State to Fort Bragg for pre-deployment training and exercises prior to a combat deployment in Afghanistan. The main brigade element mobilized on 16 January 2008. After conducting mobilization training at Fort Bragg, NC they deployed to Afghanistan beginning in March, 2008. In Afghanistan, the 27th consisted of only two battalions: a Security Forces (SECFOR) battalion and the Logistics Task Force (LTF) and was primarily responsible for the physical security of various base camps and operating bases. Individuals were "sliced" off of their parent units and assigned to police mentor teams (PMTs) or to embedded training teams (ETTs) while the bulk of the 27th conducted security operations from their FOBs. It resulted in 27th Brigade soldiers serving throughout Afghanistan. The SECFOR battalion was built around the 2d Squadron, 101st Cavalry Regiment. The LTF conducted logistics support throughout the Task Force Phoenix area of operation and supported civil military operations throughout the country. They were in-country for roughly nine months.

The 27th BCT took command of Task Force Phoenix on 26 April 2008 from the 218th BCT, South Carolina Army National Guard. They were relieved on 19 December 2008 by the 33d BCT, Illinois Army National Guard.

The 27th BCT mobilized in 2012 for Camp Shelby Mississippi, and left for the Middle East not long thereafter. Elements of the Brigade's 427th BSB were trained in customs duties and organized to support the return of equipment from the Afghanistan theater and to 427th BSB's A Co (the transportation company) was sent to Kuwait.
The 2nd Battalion, 108th Infantry, along with the 2nd Squadron, 101st Cavalry, and the South Carolina Army National Guard's 4th Battalion, 118th Infantry, based in Union, S.C. also deployed to conduct security missions. A Co. 27th BSTB based in Lockport, N.Y. conducted Route Clearance.

Order of battle
Headquarters and Headquarters Company
Special Troops Battalion
 1st Battalion, 69th Infantry Regiment, the famed Fighting 69th
 2nd Battalion, 108th Infantry Regiment
 1st Battalion, 182nd Infantry Regiment (MA NG)
 2nd Squadron, 101st Cavalry Regiment
 1st Battalion, 258th Field Artillery Regiment
427th Brigade Support Battalion
152nd Brigade Engineer Battalion

In popular fiction
The military units depicted in the movie Cloverfield are members of the 27th Infantry Brigade.

The military units in the movie I Am Legend are members of the 27th Infantry Brigade, specifically the 1st Battalion, 69th Infantry Regiment.

Elements of the 27th Infantry Division are depicted in the HBO miniseries The Pacific.

References

External links
GlobalSecurity.org: 27th Infantry Brigade
The Institute of Heraldry: 27th Infantry Brigade

Infantry 999 027
Infantry 999 027
Infantry 999 027
Military units and formations established in 1986